Sukanya Verma is an Indian journalist and film critic. She has been the principal movie reviewer with web portal Rediff.com. She has written a number of columns as a freelance writer for The Hindu. She is a member of the Film Critics Guild, founded in 2018.

Biography
Sukanya Verma was born in Mumbai, India. She is a graduate of St. Xavier's College, Mumbai.

She works as a senior film critic, music critic, columnist, features writer and quiz host with Rediff.com and its sister publication India Abroad since seventeen years.

Awards
Verma won the Best Critic Award at 5th Jagran Film Festival in 2014.

References

External links

Page on Rediff

Year of birth missing (living people)
Living people
21st-century Indian journalists
Indian film critics
Indian journalists
Indian women journalists
Indian women columnists
Journalists from Maharashtra
St. Xavier's College, Mumbai alumni